One False Move is a novel by author Harlan Coben. It is the fifth novel in his series of a crime solver and sports agent named Myron Bolitar.

Plot summary

One False Move is a novel detailing a period of time in the
life of Myron Bolitar, sports agent, and a long standing secret in his hometown. Myron
meets with Norm Zuckerman the CEO of Zoom sports manufacturing company about
his star player, Brenda Slaughter. Norm is concerned about threats that Brenda has
been receiving and wants Myron to protect her, as well as find out from where the
threats are coming. Though Myron is at first unwilling, the fact that Slaughter has no
agent sways him to agree with Norm.

Myron is intrigued by Brenda, and agrees to help her, not only to have the chance to
become her agent, but because he realizes that they have a tie from years past.
Brenda's father Horace is missing, and she wants to find him. Myron had known Horace
years ago and had considered him a friend. Horace had coached Myron in his own
basketball career, the two losing touch after Myron's career had been tragically ended.
Working with Brenda to find her father and mother, Myron realizes that he is falling in
love with her, causing him to question his long term relationship with Jessica, his live-in
lover. For years Myron had been trying to hold together a relationship that might not
have been what either party wanted. The easy peace he finds when he is with Brenda is
surprising for Myron.

The investigation leads Myron and Brenda to one of the most powerful families in New
Jersey, and a relationship between her mother and Arthur Bradford that had been kept
secret for twenty years. Brenda had always believed that her mother had left her when
she was a young girl, but Myron begins to follow leads that might lead in a different
direction. While trying to unravel the mystery of Elizabeth Bradford's death and Anita
Slaughter's connection to the family, the pair also run into problems with the mafia,
trying to persuade Brenda to leave the basketball league she is a part of and sign with
their agency and the league they will operate in the future. Twists and turns pop up at
every turn, leading Myron and Brenda through the past to find the truth in the present.

The truth is revealed in the end, too late for Brenda. Mabel Edwards, Brenda's aunt had
killed her mother for the money Anita had saved to make her new start. Mabel killed
Horace when he began to search for his wife again. Brenda's death was yet another
cover-up, simply to keep the truth from being revealed. Mabel was unaware that Arthur
Bradford was also still looking for Anita, his lover from so long ago. Bradford had been
in love with Anita, and was in reality, Brenda's father. Myron tells Arthur Bradford the
truth about Anita's disappearance and Brenda's death, leaving the powerful man to deal
with Edwards. Bradford does, having Mabel killed, finally paying for the pain she had
caused so many. In the end, Myron does not return to Jessica, preferring the memories
of the short time he shared with Brenda to the turmoil and uncertainty that he had
experienced in the past.

References

External links
 http://www.harlancoben.com/novels/one-false-move/

1998 novels
English-language novels
Novels by Harlan Coben